WTOK-FM (102.5 FM), branded on-air as HOT 102, is a radio station based in San Juan, Puerto Rico and owned by Uno Radio Group and its license held by Jesus Soto's WIAC-FM, Inc.

WTOK-FM history
During most of its history, WTOK-FM was called "Sistema 102" and the call sign was WIAC-FM. On January 9, 2009, MSG acquired WIAC-FM and at same time the Toca De To' brand.  On January 16, 2009, Toca De To' launched on WIAC-FM 102.5 FM.  On July 27, 2010, MSG Radio Inc., changed the call sign to WTOK-FM referred to the word "Toca". On July 4, 2011, began a new programming under the name of "HOT 102"

Toca De To'
The Toca De To' brand launched in May 2004 after Uno Radio Group acquired WCMN-FM. During most of its history WCMN-FM was called "Delta 107". In May 2004, WCMN-FM changed its brand name from "107.3 Delta" to just "107.3" and added the "Toca De To'" slogan which eventually became the new brand name.

In March 2007, Uno Radio Group officially acquired WMIO from Bestov Broadcasting (previously known as Audioactiva 102.3 FM) and chained it with WCMN-FM.

On January 9, 2009, MSG Radio Inc. acquired WIAC-FM from Bestov Broadcasting and signed a shared services agreement with Uno Radio Group which allows MSG Radio Inc. to use the brand Toca De To' on January 16, 2009. Old Toca De To' stations WCMN-FM 107.3 and WMIO 102.3 continue as "107.3 Mi Emisora" and do not simulcast WIAC-FM.

On July 27, 2010, MSG Radio Inc., changed the call sign to WTOK-FM, which referred to the word "Toca" (this was not to be confused with the ABC-affiliated television station in Meridian, Mississippi, which has used the WTOK call sign since its inception in 1953).

HOT 102
On July 4, 2011, began a new programming under the name of "HOT 102", leaving behind the brand "Toca De To'". The new format of the station is an American CHR, featuring a heavily Rhythmic/Dance-leaning direction but includes Pop songs. They are the only Top 40 in Puerto Rico to have a format consisting of English-language hit music. In August 2011 and after 102.5 FM change its name to Hot 102, 107.3 FM adopted again the brand "Toca De To" but this time as a slogan.

On September 21, 2012, Jesus Soto acquired WTOK-FM from MSG Radio, through licensee WIAC-FM, Inc.

On October 9, 2012, WTOK-FM acquired Mi Emisora brand and as off that very same day, the latter acts as a re-transmitter for the HOT brand.

On September 20, 2017, following the passage of Hurricane Maria across the island. WTOK-FM was forced to go off the air, but returned afterwards once power was restored to the island.

Programming

 El Drive-Time
 El Power Punch
 Kids Choice' El Show!
 Hot 102 En La Noche
 TBT 102
 Hot 102 Saturday Time
 Hot 102 Party
 Hot 102 Sunday Day
 Hot 102 Dance Lovers
 Hot 102 Playlist

Logos

References

External links
 

TOK-FM
Rhythmic contemporary radio stations in the United States
Radio stations established in 1961
1961 establishments in Puerto Rico
TOK-FM